Bodensee Arena is an arena in Kreuzlingen, Switzerland.  It is primarily used for ice hockey and is the home arena of HC Thurgau and EHC Kreuzlingen-Konstanz. Bodensee Arena opened in 2000 and holds 4,000 people.

External links
Official website

Sports venues completed in 2000
Indoor arenas in Switzerland
Indoor ice hockey venues in Switzerland
Kreuzlingen
21st-century architecture in Switzerland